"Popular" is a song from the Tony Award-winning musical Wicked. It is performed by the Broadway company's original Glinda, Kristin Chenoweth, on the original Broadway cast recording. The song is about a popular girl (Glinda) trying to help her unpopular roommate (Elphaba) become more popular.

Composition

"Popular" was written by the composer Stephen Schwartz for the first act of the 2003 musical Wicked. It is sung by the character Glinda. While writing the song, Schwartz imagined one of "those cheerleaders" - "She was the most popular girl at school, and she always went out with the captain of the football team. She was always the homecoming queen, blonde with a perky nose - the whole thing." Schwartz has compared the song to the film Clueless.

In "Popular", Glinda attempts to get Elphaba, the future Wicked Witch of the West, to conform to the accepted ideas of beauty and popularity. Schwartz described the lyrics as "empty calories" and shallow. The composition of the song is a more bubblegum sound than the rest of the musical, with Beatles influences. Glinda also yodels on the word "popular" because Schwartz was thinking of Oklahoman Kristin Chenoweth while writing the song.

On stage
Stage performances of "Popular" are often accompanied with outlandish physical comedy and improv add-ons by Glinda that highlight her bubbly character and enthusiasm. Examples include exaggerated "hair toss", humorous dance routines, and the hysterical "pillow scream" popularized by Alli Mauzey. Occasionally, Glinda's antics may cause the actress playing Elphaba to lose composure and break character to the amusement of the audience and on-stage performers alike.

Critical reception
Laura Reineke of the blog Vulture ranked "Popular" as the second-best song from Wicked, calling it "bubbly and refreshingly self-aware" and praising it for showcasing Kristin Chenoweth's singing and comedic talent.

Covers, samples, and alternate versions
"Popular" was sampled in "Popular Song" by English singer Mika featuring  American singer Ariana Grande from their albums The Origin of Love (2012) and Yours Truly (2013), respectively. It was also sampled by the producer Pheelz in his song "Popular" which features the artiste Vector for his "#A7" audio - visual album.

On July 31, 2013, Kristin Chenoweth performed a lyrically modified version of "Popular" on The Tonight Show with Jay Leno, about New York politician Anthony Weiner. In it, she tells Weiner how to be "the right kind of popular," and also his wife to "take a page from Hillary and become independent of her hubby, while [Weiner sports] a chat room chubby." Some of the original lyrics are also present.

In late 2014, Chenoweth included a multilingual version of the song in her live album Coming Home. This new rendition includes lyrics from the Japanese and German versions of the song.

In 2015, the song was covered in the sixth season of the TV series Glee. It was sung by Lea Michele and Chris Colfer as Rachel Berry and Kurt Hummel in the episode "2009".

Satirical singer Randy Rainbow made a version called "Unpopular", critical of US Pres. Donald Trump.

References

Songs from Wicked (musical)
Songs written by Stephen Schwartz (composer)
2003 songs
Kristin Chenoweth songs